Bulletin of Glaciological Research is a peer-reviewed scientific journal focusing on all aspects of snow and ice science. It is published by the Japanese Society of Snow and Ice and was established in 2000 as a successor of the Bulletin of Glacier Research (1987-1998). The current editor-in-chief (since 1 June 2017) is Tsutomu Uchida (Hokkaido University). The journal is indexed in Scopus.

Two types of papers are published: 
 Articles, containing original scientific materials and results, not submitted for publication elsewhere.
 Reports, containing preliminary results and covering activities of general interest.
Both types of papers are peer-reviewed. Papers that pass the peer-review process are published online immediately. Since Volume 28 (2010), the online archive is hosted by the service J-STAGE.

References

External links 

 Japanese Society of Snow and Ice

Open access journals
English-language journals
Glaciology journals
Annual journals
Publications established in 2000